Petro Pylypovich Pylypchuk (13 October 1947 – 18 December 2022) was a Ukrainian lawyer and judge. He served as chairman of the Supreme Court from 2011 to 2013.

Pylypchuk died on 18 December 2022, at the age of 75.

References

1947 births
2022 deaths
Ukrainian lawyers
Ukrainian judges
Judges of the Supreme Court of Ukraine
Recipients of the Order of Merit (Ukraine), 1st class
Recipients of the Order of Merit (Ukraine), 2nd class
Recipients of the Order of Merit (Ukraine), 3rd class
Recipients of the Order of Prince Yaroslav the Wise, 5th class
Laureates of the Honorary Diploma of the Verkhovna Rada of Ukraine
Yaroslav Mudryi National Law University alumni
People from Khmelnytskyi Oblast